The NCI Metathesaurus is product of the US National Cancer Institute's Enterprise Vocabulary Service, a collaborative effort of the NCI Center for Bioinformatics  and the NCI Office of Communications. The NCI Metathesaurus is based on NLM's Unified Medical Language System Metathesaurus supplemented with additional cancer-centric vocabulary.

The public version of the NCI Metathesaurus currently contains all public domain vocabularies from the National Library of Medicine's UMLS Metathesaurus, as well as a growing number of NCI-specific vocabularies developed by the National Cancer Institute.

The public version of the NCI Metathesaurus also contains proprietary vocabularies.  Certain vocabularies, such as ICD-10 and ICD-O-3, are made available, by permission, for non-commercial use only.  Others, specifically MedDRA, are made available subject to license restrictions.

See also 
 Unified Medical Language System

External links 
 NCI Metathesaurus home page
 Licensing 

Note: the text of the first version of this article was adapted from the public domain text  at http://ncimeta.nci.nih.gov/ 

Health standards
Medical classification